Michael Joseph Garzi (born March 1, 1991) is a retired American soccer player.

Career

College and amateur
Garzi played four years of college soccer at Colgate University between 2009 and 2012.

Professional
Garzi signed his first professional deal with USL Pro club Rochester Rhinos on March 24, 2014.
Won National Championship with Rochester in 2015 and was named the Community Service award winner for representing the organization within the community.
Named Captain of the 2016 team and lead the team to the Eastern Conference Semi Finals against the NY Red Bulls.

He retired in 2017 at the end of his fourth season with the Rochester Rhinos. He played in over 100 games for the club and now resides in Rochester.

Personal life
Born on March 1, 1991, in New Milford, CT. Family includes Joe and Brenda Garzi (parents), Caitlin Garzi (sister) and Sarah Garzi (wife).

References

1991 births
Living people
American soccer players
Colgate Raiders men's soccer players
Rochester New York FC players
South Kent School alumni
USL Championship players
Soccer players from Connecticut
Association football midfielders
People from New Milford, Connecticut